Duro Oni (Yorùbá: Dúró Òní; born on December 15, 1952 in Minna) is a Nigerian professor of Theatre Arts at the University of Lagos. He is the president of the Nigerian Academy of Letters. His research interests are in the areas of theatre arts design and aesthetics, stage lighting, dramatic literature and criticism, cultural studies and the Nigerian film industry/Nollywood.

Education and Career 
Oni received a diploma in Drama from the University of Ibadan in 1973. He later received Bachelor and Master of Fine Arts degrees in Performing Arts Design and Technology from the California Institute of the Arts. He earned his doctorate degree in Theatre Arts from the University of Ibadan.

In August 2021, after serving as the Vice President of the Academy from 2018 to 2021, Oni was inducted as the president of the Nigerian Academy of Letters, taking over from Francis Egbokhare. From 2013 to 2017, Duro Oni was the Deputy Vice Chancellor (Management Services) of the University of Lagos from 2013 to 2017. Before then, he was the university's Dean of the Faculty of Arts from 2009 to 2013, and the Head of the Department of Creative Arts from 2006 to 2009. He has also served as the Chief Executive Officer of the Centre for Black and African Arts and Civilization from 2000 to 2006. He also served as the pioneer Director of the Confucius Institute at the University of Lagos from 2008 to 2009. Duro Oni retired from the University of Lagos on December 15, 2022 at the age of 70 after 42 years of diligent service.

From 1990 to 1991, Oni served as the Special Adviser to the Nigerian Minister of Culture and Social Welfare, and as the Special Adviser to the Nigerian Minister of Youth and Sports from 1991 and 1992. Oni was the Director of the University of Lagos' Centre for Cultural Studies from 1992 to 1997. He initiated and developed the bachelor's degree programmes in Creative Arts, and in Chinese Studies in 1997 and 2013 respectively. 

Prior to his master's studies in California, Oni was a theatre stage technician at Ahmadu Bello University, Zaria between 1973 and 1975, following which he was nominated for the British Council Artists Fellowship programme in 1975.

Publications 
Oni has published several monographs and edited volumes, among which are:

 Striking Expressions: Theatre and Culture in National Development (2017)
 The Soyinka Impulse: Essays on Wole Soyinka edited with Bisi Adigun (2019) and 
 Larger than His Frame II: Critical Studies and Reflections on Olu Obafemi (2021).

He has also authored scholarly articles in peer-reviewed academic journals such as African Performance Review, Social Dynamics, among others.

In 2012, a festschrift, titled Fireworks for a Lighting Aesthetician: Essays and Tributes in Honour of Duro Oni @ 60, was published in honour of Oni's scholarship.

References 

Living people

1952 births
University of Ibadan alumni
Academic staff of the University of Lagos
California Institute of the Arts alumni